Andrea Vignali (born 13 June 1991) is an Italian footballer who plays as a forward or midfielder for S.S.D. Lucchese 1905.

Career

Youth career
Born in Massa, Tuscany, Vignali joined F.C. Internazionale Milano in 2005–06 season. He spent his sole season in Giovanissimi Nazionali under-15 team, as a forward. That season he scored 4 goals, as the 6th goalscorer of the team behind Mattia Destro, Joel Obi, Nicola Piras, Karim Laribi and Marco Puntoriere. (Except Obi and Laribi, all were forwards. Vignali only able to ahead other forward and wing forward such as Luca Tremolada and Giovanni Kyeremateng as 4th striker.) In August 2006 he was loaned to Spezia. In August 2007 Spezia signed Vignali outright along with Francesco Biasi and also loaned Paolo Campinoti and Alessio Lanotte from Inter academy. Vignali was a member of Allievi Nazionali under-17 team but also played a few time for the senior youth team Primavera.

Spezia bankrupted at the end of 2007–08 Serie B. Vignali joined another Serie B team Sassuolo. Sassuolo also signed number of players from Inter directly or indirectly. In 2009–10 season, he often played as an attacking midfielder or wing forward for Sassuolo's Primavera (literally "spring"), partnered with Umberto Bellani, Raffaele Conforto, Milan Jirásek (midfielder), Diego Falcinelli, Mame Baba Thiam (forward), Pellegrino Albanese (defender) and Alberto Gallinetta (goalkeeper), all former Inter players. Moreover, Giorgio Schiavini was also from Inter but already promoted to the first team in 2009–10 Serie B, and young Inter defender Nemanja Mitrović was a backup. Along with other youth product of Sassuolo, the team finished as the eleven (out of 14 team) in Group A. Vignali personally scored 2 goals. In the next season, Vignali was a midfielder of the team or one of the forwards (as wing forward) in 3–4–3 formation.

Senior career
Vignali also made his Serie B debut during 2010–11 Serie B. He replaced Andrea Catellani in the last minutes on 1 March 2011. That match Sassuolo won Pescara 2–0.

In July 2011 Vignali left for newly promoted Italian fourth division club Mantova in co-ownership deal along with Albanese. In June 2012 Vignali's registration rights was fully owned by Mantova.

However, he was soon released and joined Massese of Serie D.

Honours
Inter youth
 Campionato Giovanissimi Nazionali: 2006

References

External links
 
 
 

Italian footballers
Inter Milan players
Spezia Calcio players
U.S. Sassuolo Calcio players
Mantova 1911 players
U.S. Massese 1919 players
A.S.D. Jolly Montemurlo players
Parma Calcio 1913 players
S.S.D. Lucchese 1905 players
Serie B players
Serie D players
Association football midfielders
People from Massa
1991 births
Living people
A.S.D. Mezzolara players
Sportspeople from the Province of Massa-Carrara
Footballers from Tuscany